In United Kingdom planning law, a unitary development plan (UDP) is a development plan prepared by a metropolitan district, London Borough or some unitary local authorities.

Background
UDPs contains policies equivalent to those in both a structure plan and a local plan. UDPs were introduced by the Local Government Act 1985 and were produced up to around 2004, when the Planning and Compulsory Purchase Act 2004 replaced them with Local Plans. By virtue of specific transitional provisions, some plans are still in effect as of 2020.

The unitary development plan was used at all stages of production and is reliant on criteria-based policies. Often contentious sites are proposed, which may generate significant opposition to the proposal. The existing system of UDPs makes it very difficult to provide a clearer framework.

Purpose
An example statement describing the purpose of a UDP from Salford City Council:

The unitary development plan (UDP) is a statutory document that sets out the council's planning policies that will be used to guide development, conservation, regeneration and environmental improvement activity in Salford.

References

Housing in the United Kingdom
United Kingdom planning policy